The Shatin Community Network is a localist political group in Hong Kong. It was formed by a group of Sha Tin residents and former member of the Chinese University of Hong Kong Local Society was inspired by 2014 Occupy protests. It uses "pragmatism, locality and democracy" and aimed to win back the District Councils from the pro-Beijing camp. It won a seat in the 2015 Hong Kong district council elections.

Electoral performance

District Council elections

See also 
 Kowloon East Community
 Youngspiration

References 

Political organisations based in Hong Kong
Localist parties in Hong Kong